Hard Rock Harrigan is a 1935 American drama film directed by David Howard and starring George O'Brien, Irene Hervey and Fred Kohler.

Cast
 George O'Brien as Tim 'Hard Rock' Harrigan  
 Irene Hervey as 'Andy' Anderson  
 Fred Kohler as Black Jack Riley  
 Dean Benton as Michael McGinnis  
 Frank Rice as McClintock - Superindendant  
 Victor Potel as 'Big' Oscar  
 Olin Francis as Clancy  
 William Gould as Clark  
 George Humbert as Columbo  
 David Clyde as McNally  
 Edward Keane as Dr. Wagner  
 Lee Shumway as Casey

References

Bibliography
 George A. Katchmer. Eighty Silent Film Stars: Biographies and Filmographies of the Obscure to the Well Known. McFarland, 1991.

External links
 

1935 films
1935 drama films
American drama films
Fox Film films
Films directed by David Howard
American black-and-white films
1930s English-language films
1930s American films